Endonuclease III-like protein 1 is an enzyme that in humans is encoded by the NTHL1 gene.

As reviewed by Li et al.,  NTHL1 is a bifunctional DNA glycosylase that has an associated beta-elimination activity.  NTHL1 is usually involved in removing oxidative pyrimidine lesions through base excision repair.  NTHL1 catalyses the first step in base excision repair.  It cleaves the N-glycosylic bond between the damaged base and its associated sugar residue and then cleaves the phosphodiester bond 3' to the AP site, leaving a 3'-unsaturated aldehyde after beta-elimination and a 5'-phosphate at the termini of the repair gap.

Low expression of NTHL1 is associated with initiation and development of astrocytoma.  Low expression of NTHL1 is also found in follicular thyroid tumors.
 
A germ line homozygous mutation in NTHL1 causes a cancer susceptibility syndrome similar to Lynch syndrome.

References

Further reading